WOWA (93.7 FM) is a radio station licensed to serve the community of West Salem, Illinois. The station is owned by V.L.N. Broadcasting, Inc., and airs a classic hits format.

The station was assigned the WOWA call letters by the Federal Communications Commission on February 20, 2015.

References

External links
Official Website

OWA
Radio stations established in 2015
2015 establishments in Illinois
Classic hits radio stations in the United States
Edwards County, Illinois